Scrobipalpa concerna is a moth in the family Gelechiidae. It was described by Povolný in 1969. It is found in Mongolia.

Subspecies
Scrobipalpa concerna concerna
Scrobipalpa concerna uzbeka (Falkovitsh & Bidzilya, 2006) (Uzbekistan)

References

Scrobipalpa
Moths described in 1969
Taxa named by Dalibor Povolný